Gordon Parsons may refer to:

 Gordon Parsons (cricketer) (born 1959), English cricketer
 Gordon Parsons (singer-songwriter) (1926–1990), Australian country music singer-songwriter